Cavan Monaghan (known as Cavan-Millbrook-North Monaghan until 2007) is a township in Peterborough County in central-eastern Ontario, Canada,  southwest of the city of Peterborough.

History
The original townships of Cavan and Monaghan were surveyed by John Deyell in 1817, and were named after County Cavan and County Monaghan in Ireland, from which many of its settlers had emigrated. By 1819, there were 244 settlers, and by 1861 the population had risen to 4,901, many of whom were descendants of United Empire Loyalists, veterans of the War of 1812 who had been granted land there, or the original and later settlers from Ireland. After Confederation in 1867, the population began to drop as many families left for Western Canada.

The original Irish settlers were Protestants, and many of them were associated with the Orange Order. In the mid-19th century the "Cavan Blazers" were established as a fiercely Protestant vigilante group, who often burned down the farms of Catholic settlers.

The Township of Cavan and the Village of Millbrook, previously part of Durham County, in 1974 became part of Peterborough County, and were amalgamated, along with North Monaghan, into one township — Cavan-Millbrook-North Monaghan — in 1998. In 2007, the township was renamed Cavan Monaghan, as many thought the older name was too long.

Communities
The township of Cavan Monaghan comprises a number of villages and hamlets, including the following communities such as Carmel, Cavan, Cedar Valley, Five Mile Turn, Fraserville, Ida, Millbrook, Mount Pleasant, South Monaghan / Centreville (partially), Springville, Tapley; Bailieboro (partially), Cavan Station, Dranoel, Fairmount, Kendry, Murray Hill.

None are incorporated and a couple are relegated to just names on a map as cars made transportation easier and service areas concentrated in fewer nodes.

Millbrook
Millbrook is the township's population centre. The commercial businesses and services (banking, government) are found along King Street and County Road 10. County Road 10 provides Millbrook with convenient connections with Ontario Highway 115 and Ontario Highway 401.

It has been a filming location for several movie productions. Anne with an E (a 2017 CBC production), Sunshine Sketches of a Little Town  (a 2011 CBC production), The Music Man, Ice Princess,"Let It Snow", "Feel The Beat", The Town Christmas Forgot and A History of Violence were filmed in the town. In the latter film, Millbrook was depicted as the fictional town of Millbrook, Indiana.

The political cartoonist Sam Hunter was born and raised in Millbrook, along with award-winning filmmaker Jared Raab, esteemed Aquatic Science Biologist Dustin Raab with Fisheries and Oceans Canada, and Juno Award winner singer/songwriter Serena Ryder. Country music singer-songwriter Jade Eagleson was raised in Bailieboro.

Demographics

Economy

Cavan is home to Alltech's corn feed facility under the Masterfeeds brand. It was formerly owned by Maple Leaf Foods which opened a feed facility on Peterborough County Road 10 just north of Ontario Highway 115. Opened in 1975, the facility was then owned by Maple Leaf Mills, which relocated from the Maple Leaf Mills Silos in downtown Toronto.

Attractions
Peterborough Speedway is a 1/3 mile motor racing oval which has been in operation since 1967. The speedway hosts a weekly Saturday night stock car racing program from May to October each year including the annual Autumn Colours Classic. The weekend of races takes place during the Thanksgiving holiday weekend and is considered one of the most important stock car events in Ontario.

See also
List of townships in Ontario
List of correctional facilities in Ontario - Ontario Licence Plates were made at the Millbrook Correctional Centre, 1974-2003

References

External links

Lower-tier municipalities in Ontario
Municipalities in Peterborough County
Township municipalities in Ontario